The 2014 IQA World Cup, known at the time as the Global Games, was the second edition of the international team quidditch championship. It was played in Burnaby, Canada, and the United States won the tournament for the second time in a row, winning 210*–0 over Australia in the final.

Participating teams

Group stage

Final stage

Final ranking

Notes

References 

2014
2014 in Canadian sports
Sport in Burnaby
July 2014 sports events in Canada